The Arakawa grid system depicts different ways to represent and compute orthogonal physical quantities (especially velocity- and mass-related quantities) on rectangular grids used for Earth system models for meteorology and oceanography. For example, the Weather Research and Forecasting Model uses the Arakawa Staggered C-Grid in its atmospheric calculations when using the ARW core. The five Arakawa grids (A-E) were first introduced in Arakawa and Lamb 1977. 

For an image of the five grids, see the following picture, or Fig. 1 in Purser and Leslie 1988.

Arakawa A-grid

The "unstaggered" Arakawa A-grid evaluates all quantities at the same point on each grid cell, e.g., at the grid center or at the grid corners. The Arakawa A-grid is the only unstaggered grid type.

Arakawa B-grid

The "staggered" Arakawa B-grid separates the evaluation of the two sets of quantities. e.g., one might evaluate velocities at the grid center and masses at grid corners.

Arakawa C-grid

The "staggered" Arakawa C-grid further separates evaluation of vector quantities compared to the Arakawa B-grid. e.g., instead of evaluating both east-west (u) and north-south (v) velocity components at the grid center, one might evaluate the u components at the centers of the left and right grid faces, and the v components at the centers of the upper and lower grid faces.

Arakawa D-grid

An Arakawa D-grid is a 90° rotation of an Arakawa C-grid. E.g., instead of evaluating the v velocity components at the centers of the upper/lower grid faces and the u velocity components at the centers of the right/left grid faces, one would evaluate the v velocity components at the centers of the right/left grid faces and the u velocity components at the centers of the upper/lower grid faces.

Arakawa E-grid

The Arakawa E-grid is "staggered," but also rotated 45° relative to the other grid orientations. This allows all variables to be defined along a single face of the rectangular domain.

References

Further reading
Haltiner, G. J., and R. T. Williams, 1980. Numerical Prediction and Dynamic Meteorology. John Wiley and Sons, New York.

Numerical climate and weather models